It's Alive is a 2009 American science fiction horror film directed by Josef Rusnak. It is a remake of the 1974 film of the same name written and directed by Larry Cohen. Bijou Phillips stars as a mother who has a murderous baby.

Plot 
In Albuquerque, New Mexico. Lenore Harker leaves college to have a baby with her architect boyfriend, Frank. After discovering the baby has doubled in size in just a month, doctors  extract the baby by Caesarian section. After the doctor cuts the umbilical cord, the newborn baby Daniel goes on a rampage and kills the surgical team in the operating room. He afterwards crawls onto his mother's belly and falls asleep. Lenore and Daniel are found on the operating table, the room covered in blood. Lenore has no memory of what happened.
 
After questioning by the police, Lenore is allowed to take Daniel home. Authorities arrange for a psychologist to help her regain her memory of the delivery. Soon, Daniel bites Lenore when she feeds him, revealing his taste for blood.
 
Daniel begins to attack small animals and progresses to killing adult humans. One of his victims is the therapist who came to Lenore and Frank's house who wants to try hypnosis on Lenore but she refuses. She asks the therapist to leave. Lenore refuses to accept that her baby is a cannibalistic killer. Frank comes home from work to find Lenore sitting in the baby's room, but Daniel is not in his crib. The electricity goes off. Frank goes to check the fuse and at the same time searches for Daniel in the basement. Then he finds himself locked in. Daniel kills Marco, the police officer who came with Sergeant Perkins. Perkins finds Frank in the basement. As Perkins and Frank search for Daniel, Daniel suddenly drops down on Perkins and kills him. Frank captures Daniel with a rubbish can, but cannot bring himself to kill him. Daniel leaps out of the rubbish can and attacks Frank when he lifts the lid off the rubbish can.

Lenore finds Frank injured, and she brings Daniel into the burning house. Frank and his brother, Chris watch helplessly as the house burns with Lenore and Daniel inside.

Cast

Production 
Shooting began in Sofia, Bulgaria, in March 2007.

Release 
The film was released straight-to-DVD in the United States on October 6, 2009. It is available in both rated and unrated editions.  The film had theatrical release in the Philippines in August 2009.  Outside the US, it grossed $957,897.

Reception 
Gareth Jones of Dread Central rated it 3/5 stars and wrote, "Don’t go into It's Alive expecting a genuinely good movie (let's face it, neither was the original), but do expect to be entertained."  Brian Orndorf of DVD Talk rated it 1.5/5 stars and wrote that the film "lacks suspense or even basic waves of dread".

Not all reviews of the film were negative.
HorrorFreakNews.com awarded the film 3 out of 5 stars, writing, "It’s Alive intelligently shifts conventional scary movie making. Moreover, the movie cleverly pushes the viewer to focus on the evil incarnated by the child."

Larry Cohen, the director of the 1974 original, was interviewed on December 21, 2009, regarding the remake and commented : "It's a terrible picture. It's just beyond awful. ... I would advise anybody who likes my film to cross the street and avoid seeing the new enchilada."

References

External links 
 

 

2009 films
2009 horror films
2000s monster movies
2000s science fiction horror films
Remakes of American films
American monster movies
American science fiction horror films
Films about babies
Films about cannibalism
Films set in New Mexico
Films shot in Bulgaria
Horror film remakes
Films with screenplays by Larry Cohen
Films scored by Nicholas Pike
2000s English-language films
Films directed by Josef Rusnak
2000s American films